Kévin Monnet-Paquet (born 19 August 1988) is a French professional footballer who plays as a winger for Cypriot First Division club Aris Limassol. Nicknamed Tuppy, he has represented France at under-18 and under-19 level.

Club career
Monnet-Paquet scored his first senior league goal with Lens against Valenciennes on the 23 January 2008 in a 2–1 win away at the Stade Nungesser.

On 19 August 2021, Monnet-Paquet joined Aris Limassol in Cyprus.

Personal life
Monnet-Paquet's mother is of Rwandan descent and his father is French.

Career statistics

Honours 
Lens

 Ligue 2: 2008–09

References

1988 births
Sportspeople from Isère
People from Bourgoin-Jallieu
French people of Rwandan descent
Living people
French footballers
France youth international footballers
France under-21 international footballers
Association football wingers
Association football forwards
FC Bourgoin-Jallieu players
RC Lens players
FC Lorient players
AS Saint-Étienne players
Aris Limassol FC players
Ligue 1 players
Ligue 2 players
French expatriate footballers
Expatriate footballers in Cyprus
French expatriate sportspeople in Cyprus
Footballers from Auvergne-Rhône-Alpes